Carlito's Way is a 1993 American crime drama film directed by Brian De Palma, based on the novels Carlito's Way (1975) and After Hours (1979) by Judge Edwin Torres. The film adaptation was scripted by David Koepp. It stars Al Pacino, Sean Penn, Penelope Ann Miller, Luis Guzman, John Leguizamo, Jorge Porcel, Joseph Siravo, and Viggo Mortensen.

Pacino plays Carlito Brigante, a Nuyorican criminal who vows to go straight and to retire in paradise. However, his criminal past proves difficult to escape, and he unwittingly ends up being dragged into the same activities that got him imprisoned in the first place. The film is based mainly on After Hours, but used the title of the first novel to avoid it being confused with Martin Scorsese's 1985 film of the same name. This is the second film collaboration between Pacino and De Palma, after 1983's film, Scarface.

Carlito's Way received a positive response from critics, with a lukewarm result at the box office, but has subsequently become a cult film. Both Penn and Miller received Golden Globe nominations for their performances. A prequel titled Carlito's Way: Rise to Power, based on the first novel, was released direct-to-video in 2005.

Plot
In 1975 New York, after having served five years of a 30-year prison sentence, career criminal Carlito Brigante is freed on a legal technicality exploited by his close friend and lawyer, Dave Kleinfeld. Carlito vows to end his unlawful activities but is persuaded to accompany his young cousin Guajiro to a drug deal held at a bar. Guajiro's suppliers betray and kill him, forcing Carlito to shoot his way out. Later, Carlito takes Guajiro's $30,000 from the botched deal and uses it to buy into a nightclub owned by a gambling addict named Saso, intending to save $75,000 to retire to the Caribbean.

As nightclub co-owner, Carlito declines several offers for a business partnership with a hot-headed young gangster from the Bronx named Benny Blanco. Carlito also rekindles his romance with his former girlfriend Gail, a ballet dancer moonlighting as a stripper. Kleinfeld develops a love interest with Benny's girlfriend, Steffie, a waitress at the club. Benny's frustration with Carlito's constant rejections boils over and he confronts Carlito one night at his table. Carlito publicly humiliates Benny, who reacts by manhandling Steffie. Fueled by his now-extensive use of alcohol and cocaine, Kleinfeld brazenly pulls out a gun and threatens to kill Benny, but Carlito intervenes. Despite being personally threatened by Benny himself, Carlito lets him go unharmed, a decision which alienates Carlito's bodyguard Pachanga.

Kleinfeld, who stole $1 million in payoff money from his client, Mafia boss Anthony Taglialucci, is coerced into providing his yacht to help Taglialucci break out of the Rikers Island prison barge. Kleinfeld begs for Carlito's assistance in the prison break, and Carlito reluctantly agrees. That night, Carlito, Kleinfeld, and Taglialucci's son Frankie sail to a floating buoy outside of the barge where Taglialucci is waiting. As they pull Taglialucci aboard, Kleinfeld kills him and Frankie and dumps their bodies in the East River, claiming that they would have killed him anyway. He then smugly admits to stealing Taglialucci's money. Knowing mob retaliation is imminent, Carlito immediately severs his ties with Kleinfeld and decides to leave town with Gail. The next day, Kleinfeld barely survives a retaliatory assassination attempt at his office.

The police apprehend Carlito and take him to the office of District Attorney Norwalk, where he is played a tape of Kleinfeld offering to testify to false criminal allegations against Carlito. Norwalk advises that he is aware that Carlito is an accomplice to the Taglialucci murders in an attempt to leverage him into betraying Kleinfeld, but Carlito refuses. In the hospital, Carlito visits Kleinfeld, who confesses to selling him out. Having noticed a suspicious man dressed in a police uniform waiting in the lobby, Carlito secretly unloads Kleinfeld's revolver and leaves. The man is Taglialucci's other son, Vinnie, seeking vengeance for his brother and father. After sending the officer already guarding Kleinfeld away, Vinnie enters Kleinfeld's room and shoots him dead.

Carlito buys train tickets to Miami for himself and Gail, now pregnant. When he stops by his club to get the stashed money, Carlito is met by a group of East Harlem Italian gangsters led by Vinnie. The Italians plan to kill Carlito, but he manages to slip out through a secret exit. The Italians pursue him throughout the city's subway system and into Grand Central Terminal, where they engage in a gunfight. Carlito kills all of his pursuers except Vinnie, whom the police shoot and kill. As Carlito runs to catch the train where Gail and Pachanga are waiting for him, Benny ambushes him and fatally shoots him several times with a silenced gun. Pachanga admits to Carlito that he is now working for Benny, but Benny then shoots him dead as well. Carlito hands a tearful Gail the money and tells her to escape with their unborn child and start a new life. Carlito is wheeled away on a gurney to be taken to the hospital. As he dies, Carlito stares at a billboard with a Caribbean beach and a picture of a woman. The billboard then comes to life in his mind, and the woman, now Gail, starts dancing.

Cast
 Al Pacino as Carlito Brigante (called "Charlie" by Gail). Pacino came to Carlito's Way directly from his Oscar-winning role in Scent of a Woman. To get into the character, he accompanied Torres through East Harlem to absorb the sights and atmosphere. Pacino first envisioned Carlito with a ponytail, but, after visiting Harlem, he quickly realized such a hairstyle was uncommon among the local men. The beard was Pacino's idea. The black leather coat fit into the period setting.
 Sean Penn as David Kleinfeld. For the pivotal role of Carlito's sleazy lawyer and best friend, Penn was lured back from early retirement by the challenge of playing the corrupt lawyer. Taking the role meant that he could finance his movie The Crossing Guard and work with Pacino. De Palma and Penn sat down and discussed what '70s mob lawyers looked like. Penn shaved the hair on the front of his forehead to give the appearance of a receding hairline. He permed the rest. Alan Dershowitz, believing that Penn was attempting to look like him, threatened the filmmakers with a defamation lawsuit.
 Penelope Ann Miller as Gail. Casting for Gail proved difficult because of the character's striptease scenes. The character needed someone who was both a talented dancer and actor.
 John Leguizamo as "Benny Blanco from the Bronx", an up-and-coming gangster who is determined to exceed Carlito's reputation but lacks any sense of ethics.
 Luis Guzmán as Pachanga. In Koepp's first draft of the screenplay, Pachanga spoke in a very heavy slang style. Following rumbles from the Latino cast and crew, Koepp toned this down.
 Ángel Salazar as Walberto
 Jorge Porcel as Reinaldo "Ron" Saso
 Al Israel as Rolando Ruiz
 Ingrid Rogers as Steffie
 James Rebhorn as District Attorney Bill Norwalk
 John Finn as Detective Duncan
 Michael P. Moran as Party Guest
 Joseph Siravo as Vincent Taglialucci
 Frank Minucci as Tony "Tony T" Taglialucci
 Rocco Sisto as Panama Hatman
 Adrian Pasdar as Frankie Taglialucci
 Richard Foronjy as Pete Amadesso
 Vincent Pastore as Copa Wiseguy
 Viggo Mortensen as Lalin Miasso
 John Augstin Ortiz as Guajiro
 Jaime Sánchez as Rudy

Production
Pacino first heard about the character Carlito Brigante in a YMCA gym in New York City in 1973. Pacino was working out for his movie Serpico when he met New York state supreme court Judge Edwin Torres (the author who was writing the novels Carlito's Way and After Hours). When the novels were completed Pacino read them and liked them, especially the character of Carlito. Inspiration for the novels came from Torres' background: the East Harlem barrio where he was born and its atmosphere of gangs, drugs and poverty.  In 1989, Pacino faced a $6 million lawsuit from producer Elliott Kastner. Kastner claimed Pacino had gone back on an agreement to star in his version of a Carlito movie with Marlon Brando as criminal lawyer David Kleinfeld. The suit was dropped and the project was abandoned.

Pacino went to producer Martin Bregman with the intention of getting a Carlito Brigante film made and showed him an early draft of a screenplay, which Bregman rejected. Both Bregman and Pacino agreed that the character of Brigante would provide a suitable showcase for Pacino's talents. Bregman approached screenwriter David Koepp, who had just finished writing the script for Bregman's forthcoming The Shadow, and asked him to write the script for Carlito's Way. The decision came that the screenplay would be based on the second novel After Hours. Carlito at this stage would match closer with Pacino's age. Although based primarily on the second novel, the title Carlito's Way remained, mainly because of the existence of Martin Scorsese's movie After Hours. Bregman would work closely with Koepp for two years to develop the shooting script for Carlito's Way.

Koepp wrestled with the voice-over throughout the writing process. Initially the voice-over was to take place in the hospital, but De Palma suggested the train station platform.  The hospital scenes were written 25 to 30 times because the actors had trouble with the sequence, with Pacino even thinking that Carlito would not go to the hospital. With one final re-write Koepp managed to make the scene work to Pacino's satisfaction. In the novels Kleinfeld does not die, but De Palma has a huge sense of justice and retribution. He could not have Carlito killed off and have Kleinfeld live.

At one point, The Long Good Friday director, John Mackenzie, was linked with the film. When Carlito's Way and its sequel After Hours were optioned, Martin Bregman had Abel Ferrara in mind. However, when Bregman and Ferrara parted ways, De Palma was brought in. Bregman explained that this decision was not about "getting the old team back together", rather than making use of the best talent available. De Palma, reluctantly, read the script and as soon as Spanish-speaking characters cropped up he feared it would be Scarface all over again. He said that he did not want to make another Spanish-speaking gangster movie. When De Palma finally did read it all the way through, he realized it was not what he thought it was. De Palma liked the script and envisioned it as a noir movie. Bregman supervised casting throughout the various stages of pre-production, and carefully selected the creative team who would make the film a reality. This included production designer Richard Sylbert, editor Bill Pankow, costume designer Aude Bronson-Howard and director of photography Stephen Burum.

Initially, filming began on March 22, 1993, though the first scheduled shoot, the Grand Central Station climax, had to be changed when Pacino showed up on crutches. Instead, the tension-building pool hall sequence, where Carlito accompanies his young cousin Guajiro on an ill-fated drug deal, started the production. Because the film was heavily character based and featured little action, the early pool sequence had to be elaborate and set up right. A huge amount of time was spent setting it up and filming it. After the film studio had viewed a cut of the pool hall sequence, a note was passed onto the crew stating that they felt the scene was too long. De Palma spent more time adding to the sequence and with the help of editor Bill Pankow made it work. The producers came back saying "much better shorter."

Apart from the poster sequence, which was shot in Florida, the entire movie was filmed on location in New York. De Palma roamed Manhattan searching for suitable visual locations. A tenement on 115th Street became the site of Carlito's homecoming: the barrio scene. The courtroom, in which Carlito thanks the prosecutor, was shot in Judge Torres's workplace, the State Supreme Court Building at 60 Centre Street. The Club Paradise was initially in a West Side brownstone as the model for the book's postprandial premises. But this was considered too cramped for filming. A multi-level bistro club designed by De Palma took shape at the Kaufman-Astoria Studios in Long Island City, in a style of 1970's art deco disco.

Tony Taglialucci's escape from Rikers Island, a night shoot mid-river, was considered impossible. Instead, the production used a Brooklyn shipyard where Kleinfeld's boat was lowered into an empty "lock" into which river water was pumped. Smoke machines and towers of space lights were installed.

For a climactic finale, De Palma staged a chase from the platform of the Harlem-125th Street (Metro-North) Station to the escalators of Grand Central Terminal. For the shoot, trains were re-routed and timed so that Pacino and his pursuers could dart from car to hurtling car. The length of the escalator scene during the climactic shoot out at Grand Central Station caused a headache for editor Pankow. He had to piece together the sequences so that the audience would be so tied up in the action that they would not be thinking about how long the escalator was running.

Reception
Carlito's Way wrapped on July 20, 1993, and was released on November 3, 1993. Critical response to the theatrical release was somewhat lukewarm. The film was criticized for re-treading old ground, mainly De Palma's own Scarface and The Untouchables. Roger Ebert stated in his review that the film is one of De Palma's finest with some of the best set-pieces he has done. Patrick Doyle was praised on his scoring of the film soundtrack, which was described as "elegiac" and "hauntingly beautiful," which "displays Doyle as one of the major talents of modern film scoring." Peter Travers (of Rolling Stone) criticized the film for Pacino's "Rican" accent slipping into his "Southern drawl from Scent of a Woman", "De Palma's erratic pacing and derivative shootouts" and "what might have been if Carlito's Way had forged new ground and not gone down smokin' in the shadow of Scarface."

On the Siskel & Ebert show, Ebert gave the film a thumbs up while Siskel gave it a thumbs down. Owen Gleiberman (from Entertainment Weekly) described the film as "a competent and solidly unsurprising urban-underworld thriller" and is "okay entertainment," but went on to say that the plot would have worked better "as a lean and mean Miami Vice episode." The film has an approval rating of 82% on Rotten Tomatoes based on 49 reviews, with a weighted average of 7.10/10. The site's consensus states: "Carlito's Way reunites De Palma and Pacino for a more wistful take on the crime epic, delivering a stylish thriller with a beating heart beneath its pyrotechnic performances and set pieces."

Bregman was surprised about some of the negative reviews, but stated that some of the same reviewers have since "retracted" their views upon further discussions of the film. A few weeks before the film's premiere, De Palma told the crew not to get their hopes up about the film's reception. He correctly predicted that Pacino, having just won an Oscar, would be criticized; Koepp, having just done Jurassic Park, would "suck"; Penn would be "brilliant" because he had not done anything for a while; and he himself, having not been forgiven for The Bonfire of the Vanities, would not quite be embraced.

Carlito's Way premiered with an opening weekend box office taking of over $9 million. At the end of its theatrical run, the film had grossed over $37 million domestically. Sean Penn and Penelope Ann Miller both received Golden Globe nominations for their respective roles as Kleinfeld and Gail. The later appreciation of the film was highlighted when the French publication Cahiers du cinéma named it as one of the three best films of the 1990s, along with
The Bridges of Madison County and Goodbye South, Goodbye.

Accolades

Music
Patrick Doyle composed the original score, while Musical supervisor Jellybean Benitez supplemented the soundtrack with elements of salsa, merengue and other authentic styles.

Score

Soundtrack

Releases
The film was released on VHS, and on LaserDisc in standard and widescreen versions. It was later released on DVD in 2004, with an Ultimate Edition following in 2005. The Ultimate Edition DVD includes deleted scenes, an interview with De Palma, a making-of documentary, and more. In 2007, an HD DVD version was released, which features the same bonus material as the Ultimate Edition. The film was released on Blu-ray on May 18, 2010.

Prequel

A prequel based on Edwin Torres' first novel was released direct-to-video in 2005, with the title Carlito's Way: Rise to Power. Critically panned, the film nevertheless received Torres's blessing as an accurate adaptation of the first novel.

In popular culture
Samples from this movie have been used by many bands including Slipknot and Overkill. Carlito's threatening monologue was sampled for the intro in Brooklyn's Finest by Jay-Z featuring The Notorious B.I.G.. The line “here comes the pain” was especially known through the Slipknot song “(sic)” off of their 1999 Debut Album.

Notes

References
 Universal Pictures, Carlito's Way "Press Pack", 1993.
 Highbury Entertainment, "The Making Of Carlito's Way", Hotdog Magazine, August 2000.

External links

 
 
 
 
 
 

 
1993 films
1993 crime drama films
American crime drama films
American films about revenge
Films about the American Mafia
Films about drugs
Films about murderers
Films based on American novels
Films based on multiple works of a series
Films directed by Brian De Palma
Films produced by Martin Bregman
Films scored by Patrick Doyle
Films set in 1975
Films set in New York City
Films shot in New York City
Films with screenplays by David Koepp
Universal Pictures films
1990s English-language films
1990s American films